Ariel is a 1988 Finnish drama film directed and written by Aki Kaurismäki. The film tells the story of Taisto Kasurinen (Turo Pajala), a Finnish coal miner who must find a way to live in the big city after the mine closes.

Taisto's friend is played by Matti Pellonpää, an actor who appeared in many of Kaurismäki's early films, before his death in 1995.

This is the second film in Kaurismäki's Proletariat Trilogy (Shadows in Paradise, Ariel, and The Match Factory Girl). The trilogy has been released on Region One DVD by Criterion in its Eclipse box-sets. The film is included in the 1001 Movies You Must See Before You Die list. The film was entered into the 16th Moscow International Film Festival, where Turo Pajala won the Bronze St. George for Best Actor.

Kaurismäki has called Ariel his best film in his career.

Plot
In Finnish Lapland, a group of coal miners are demolishing the redundant mine that has provided their income for years. One of the miners, Taisto Kasurinen (Turo Pajala), finds himself freshly out of work, sitting in a cafe with his depressed father. His father gives Taisto the keys to his old (1962) white Cadillac convertible, then walks into the men's room and shoots himself. Kasurinen drives the convertible to Southern Finland, where he is promptly mugged and has his life savings stolen. He gets a day-labor job and finds a cheap bed at a nearby hostel.

Kasurinen strikes up a romance with Irmeli, a metermaid who was ticketing his car, who quits her job in order to go to dinner with him during her shift. In bed together at her home, they discuss their pasts. Irmeli recounts stories of her ex-husband and Kasurinen tells her that he is from the country, to which she replies "that's different". He is woken up by Irmeli's young son holding a gun in his face and offering him breakfast.

Kasurinen is kicked out of the hostel when he fails to pay for his bed and begins sleeping in his car. In need of money, he reluctantly sells it. He drifts around the city, occasionally smoking cigarette butts left in ashtrays. While sitting in a diner, he spots one of the men who robbed him, chases him, grabs the knife the man pulls out and holds him at knifepoint. The police arrive, and Kasurinen is arrested and charged with attempted armed robbery. He is sentenced to nearly two years in jail. As he is leaving the courtroom, he makes eye contact with a distressed Irmeli from across the room.

In prison, Kasurinen meets his cellmate Mikkonen (Matti Pellonpää). Irmeli and her son visit him regularly. On one visit, Kasurinen proposes marriage to Irmeli, who accepts. Later, Irmeli delivers a birthday cake and a present with a saw inside it to Taisto at the prison. He and Mikkonen use the saw to create a weapon with which to escape. Outside, Kasurinen and Irmeli get married. A series of misadventures ensues as Kasurinen and Mikkonen try to avoid the law and scrape together some money for fake passports by robbing a bank. Mikkonen is fatally wounded after he gets into a dispute over money with the men who provide the passports. Taisto buries his friend at a local dump (as was requested), then he uses the fake passport to board a boat to Mexico with Irmeli and her son, hoping to find a better life.

Cast

Home media 
A digitally restored version of the film was released on DVD by The Criterion Collection as part of its Eclipse Series.

References

External links
 
 
 
 
 
 
 

1988 films
Films directed by Aki Kaurismäki
1980s Finnish-language films
1980s drama road movies
Finnish drama films
1988 drama films